Pakkathu Veettu Roja is a 1982 Indian Tamil-language comedy film directed by  M. Bhaskar, starring Karthik and Radha. The film was released on 2 September 1982.

Plot

Cast 
Karthik
Radha
Goundamani
Krishna Rao
Janagaraj
S. S. Chandran
Shawnawaz
Thyagu
Manorama
Nazreen
Rani Padmini
Sathisri

Soundtrack 
The soundtrack was composed by Shankar–Ganesh.

References

External links 
 

1980s Tamil-language films
1982 comedy films
1982 films
Films directed by M. Bhaskar
Films scored by Shankar–Ganesh
Indian comedy films